Reinhard Genzel  (born 24 March 1952) is a German astrophysicist, co-director of the Max Planck Institute for Extraterrestrial Physics, a professor at LMU and an emeritus professor at the University of California, Berkeley. He was awarded the 2020 Nobel Prize in Physics "for the discovery of a supermassive compact object at the centre of our galaxy", which he shared with Andrea Ghez and Roger Penrose. In a 2021 interview given to Federal University of Pará in Brazil, Genzel recalls his journey as a physicist; the influence of his father, Ludwig Genzel; his experiences working with Charles H. Townes; and more.

Life and career
Genzel was born in Bad Homburg vor der Höhe, Germany, the son of Eva-Maria Genzel and Ludwig Genzel, a professor of solid state physics (1922–2003). He studied physics at the University of Freiburg and the University of Bonn, graduating in 1978 with a PhD in radioastronomy which he prepared at the Max Planck Institute for Radio Astronomy Subsequently he worked at the Center for Astrophysics  Harvard & Smithsonian in Cambridge, Massachusetts. He was a Miller Fellow from 1980 until 1982, and also Associate and finally Full Professor in the Department of Physics at the University of California, Berkeley from 1981. In 1986, he left Berkeley to become a director at the Max Planck Institute for Extraterrestrial Physics in Garching and Scientific Member of the Max-Planck-Gesellschaft. During that time he also lectured at Ludwig-Maximilians-Universität München, where he has been Honorary Professor since 1988. From 1999 to 2016, he also had a part-time joint appointment as Full Professor at the University of California, Berkeley. Additional activities include sitting on the selection committee for the Shaw Prize in astronomy.

Work
Reinhard Genzel studies infrared- and submillimetre astronomy. He and his group are
active in developing ground- and space-based instruments for astronomy. They used these to track the motions of stars at the centre of the Milky Way, around Sagittarius A*, and show that they were orbiting a very massive object, now known to be a black hole. Genzel is also active in studies of the formation and evolution of galaxies.

In July 2018, Reinhard Genzel et al. reported that star S2 orbiting Sgr A* had been recorded at 7,650 km/s or 2.55% the speed of light leading up to the pericentre approach in May 2018 at about 120 AU ≈ 1400 Schwarzschild radii from Sgr A*. This allowed them to test the redshift predicted by general relativity at relativistic velocities, finding additional confirmation of the theory.

Awards
 Studienstiftung des deutschen Volkes, 1973–1975
 Miller Research Fellowship, 1980–1982
 Otto Hahn Medal, Max-Planck-Gesellschaft, 1980
 Presidential Young Investigator Award, National Science Foundation, 1984
 Newton Lacy Pierce Prize, American Astronomical Society, 1986
 Gottfried Wilhelm Leibniz Prize, Deutsche Forschungsgemeinschaft, 1990
 De Vaucouleurs Medal, University of Texas, 2000
 Prix Jules Janssen, Société astronomique de France (French Astronomical Society), 2000
 Stern Gerlach Medal for experimental physics, Deutsche Physikalische Gesellschaft, 2003
 Balzan Prize for Infrared Astronomy, 2003
 Albert Einstein Medal, 2007
 Shaw Prize, 2008
 "Galileo 2000" Prize, 2009
 Karl Schwarzschild Medal, Deutsche Astronomische Gesellschaft, 2011
 Crafoord Prize, Royal Swedish Academy, 2012
 Tycho Brahe Prize, European Astronomical Society, 2012
 Pour le Mérite, 2013
 Harvey Prize, Technion Institute, Israel, 2014
 Herschel Medal, Royal Astronomical Society, 2014
 Nobel Prize in Physics, 2020

Membership of scientific societies
 Fellow of the American Physical Society, 1985
 Foreign member of the Académie des Sciences (Institut de France), 1998
 Foreign member of the United States National Academy of Sciences, 2000
 Member of the Deutsche Akademie der Naturforscher Leopoldina, 2002
 Senior member of the Bayerische Akademie der Wissenschaften, 2003
 Foreign member of the Royal Spanish Academy of Sciences, 2011
 Foreign member of the Royal Society of London, 2012
 Member of the Pontifical Academy, 2020

References

External links

 Genzel's Homepage at MPE
 Genzel's Profile at the MPG
 The Balzan-Stiftung award
 Black Holes and Galaxies 27 July 2009 – ANU podcast mp3 also available as video on youtube
 Black Holes and Galaxies: Professor Reinhard Genzel – ANU TV on youtube
 

1952 births
Albert Einstein Medal recipients
Fellows of the American Physical Society
Foreign associates of the National Academy of Sciences
Foreign Members of the Royal Society
German astrophysicists
German Nobel laureates
Gottfried Wilhelm Leibniz Prize winners
Knights Commander of the Order of Merit of the Federal Republic of Germany
Living people
Members of the French Academy of Sciences
Nobel laureates in Physics
Recipients of the Pour le Mérite (civil class)
Studienstiftung alumni
University of Bonn alumni
University of California, Berkeley faculty
Max Planck Institute directors